is a passenger railway station located in Makuharicho, Hanamigawa-ku, Chiba, Japan, operated by East Japan Railway Company (JR East).

Lines
Makuhari Station is served by the Chūō-Sōbu Line (local service)  and is located 7.6 kilometers from Chiba Station and 31.6 kilometers from the starting point of the line at Tokyo Station.

Station layout
The station consists of an island platform serving two tracks with an elevated station building located above the platform and tracks.  The station is staffed. Tracks for non-stop Sōbu Line (Rapid) services are situated on the north side of the platforms.

Platforms

History

The station opened on 9 December 1894. With the privatization of Japanese National Railways (JNR) on 1 April 1987, the station came under the control of JR East.

Passenger statistics
In fiscal 2019, the station was used by an average of 15,944 passengers daily (boarding passengers only).

Surrounding area
 Keisei Makuhari Station (on the Keisei Chiba Line)
 JR East Makuhari Depot

See also
 List of railway stations in Japan

References

External links

 JR East station information (JR East) 

Railway stations in Chiba (city)
Stations of East Japan Railway Company
Railway stations in Japan opened in 1894
Chūō-Sōbu Line